The Crow and the Pitcher is one of Aesop's Fables, numbered 390 in the Perry Index. It relates ancient observation of corvid behaviour that recent scientific studies have confirmed is goal-directed and indicative of causal knowledge rather than simply being due to instrumental conditioning.

The fable and its moral
The fable is made the subject of a poem by the first century CE Greek Poet Bianor,  was included in the 2nd century fable collection of pseudo-Dositheus and later appears in the 4th–5th-century Latin verse collection by Avianus. The history of this fable in antiquity and the Middle Ages is tracked in A.E. Wright's Hie lert uns der meister: Latin Commentary and the Germany Fable.

The story concerns a thirsty crow that comes upon a pitcher with water at the bottom, beyond the reach of its beak. After failing to push it over, the bird drops in pebbles one by one until the water rises to the top of the pitcher, allowing it to drink. In his telling, Avianus follows it with a moral that emphasises the virtue of ingenuity: "This fable shows us that thoughtfulness is superior to brute strength." Other tellers of the story stress the crow's persistence. In Francis Barlow's edition the proverb 'Necessity is the mother of invention' is applied to the story while an early 20th-century retelling quotes the proverb 'Where there's a will, there's a way'.

Artistic use of the fable may go back to Roman times, since one of the mosaics that has survived is thought to have the story of the crow and the pitcher as its subject. Modern equivalents have included English tiles from the 18th and 19th centuries and an American mural by Justin C. Gruelle (1889–1978), created for a Connecticut school. These and the illustrations in books of fables had little scope for invention. The greatest diversity is in the type of vessel involved and over the centuries these have varied from a humble clay pot to elaborate Greek pitchers.

The fable in science
The Roman naturalist Pliny the Elder is the earliest to attest that the story reflects the behaviour of real-life corvids. In August 2009, a study published in Current Biology  revealed that rooks, a relative of crows, do just the same as the crow in the fable when presented with a similar situation. The ethologist Nicola Clayton, also taking the fable as a starting point, found that other corvids are capable of the thinking demonstrated there. Eurasian jays were able to drop stones into a pitcher of water to make the water level rise. Further research established that the birds understood that the pitcher must contain liquid rather than a solid for the  trick to work, and that the objects dropped in must sink rather than float. New Caledonian crows perform similarly, but Western scrub-jays appear to fail. The findings have advanced knowledge of bird intelligence; the Eurasian jay had not been scientifically observed to use tools either in the wild or in captivity before. The research also indicated that physical cognition evolved earlier in the corvid family than previously thought as the not closely related crows and ravens were already known to score highly on intelligence tests, with certain species topping the avian IQ scale and tool use is well-documented. Unrelated birds, the great-tailed grackles, also pass the test due to remarkable behavioral flexibility. Such tool use has been observed in great apes as well and the researchers were quoted as drawing a parallel between their findings and the fable.

References

External links

15th-20th-century illustrations from books
YouTube clip from "Inside the Animal Mind" (BBC Two Program) showing a crow solving a puzzle in order to get food.

Aesop's Fables
Greek Anthology
Fictional crows
ATU 220-249